Pleskot (Czech feminine: Pleskotová) is a surname. Notable people with the surname include:

 Jaromír Pleskot (1922–2009), Czech director and screenwriter
 Jiří Pleskot (1922–1997), Czech actor
 Josef Pleskot (born 1952), Czech architect

See also
 

Czech-language surnames